Floyd Mayweather Jr. vs. Marcos Maidana II, billed as Mayhem, was a world championship boxing match held on September 13, 2014, in the MGM Grand Garden Arena in Las Vegas, United States.

The fight was won by Mayweather via unanimous decision, with scores of 116-111 twice and 115-112.

Background 
The pair fought earlier that year at the MGM Grand. Despite the bout being closer than most Mayweather bouts, Mayweather won by Majority Decision. The fight with Maidana proved to be one of Floyd's tougher opponents, thus, the rematch seemed likely.

Fight card

References

External links
 Floyd Mayweather vs. Marcos Maidana II Official Fight Card from BoxRec
 Floyd Mayweather vs. Marcos Maidana 2 on Showtime
 Floyd Mayweather vs. Marcos Maidana II on BoxNation

Maidana
2014 in boxing
Boxing in Las Vegas
Boxing on Showtime
2014 in sports in Nevada
Golden Boy Promotions
September 2014 sports events in the United States
MGM Grand Garden Arena